Derrick Smith (born January 22, 1965) is a Canadian former professional ice hockey centre who played ten seasons in the National Hockey League (NHL) with the Philadelphia Flyers, Minnesota North Stars and Dallas Stars. As a youth, he played in the 1978 Quebec International Pee-Wee Hockey Tournament with the Toronto Young Nationals minor ice hockey team.

Career
Smith was born and raised in the Toronto suburb of Scarborough, Ontario. He played junior hockey for Scarborough's Wexford Raiders, then joined the Peterborough Petes of the major junior Ontario Hockey League.

He was drafted by the Philadelphia Flyers in the 1983 NHL Entry Draft. He debuted as a professional with Philadelphia in 1984. He played seven seasons with Philadelphia before joining the Minnesota North Stars as a free agent in 1991. He would play 34 games in the NHL for the Stars organization, finishing his career in the minors in 1999.

Career statistics

References

External links
 

1965 births
Living people
Baton Rouge Kingfish players
Canadian ice hockey centres
Dallas Stars players
Kalamazoo Wings (1974–2000) players
Minnesota North Stars players
Peterborough Petes (ice hockey) players
Philadelphia Flyers draft picks
Philadelphia Flyers players
Sportspeople from Scarborough, Toronto
Ice hockey people from Toronto